The second and final season of Falsa identidad American television series is produced by Telemundo Global Studios and directed by Conrado Martínez, Sergio Osorio, and Moisés Ortiz-Urquidi, the season was first announced in January 2019 by Telemundo. The season premiered on 22 September 2020, and concluded on 25 January 2021.

Plot 
In the second season, Diego and Isabel have assumed new identities under the federal witness protection program and start a new life in Nebraska. While Diego struggles to adjust to his new identity, for Isabel the change has given her self-assurance to help her family. However, an extreme situation in their lives forces their return to Mexico, and once again, they will be forced to face their enemies.

Cast 
An extensive cast list was published on 10 August 2020 in a press release.

 Luis Ernesto Franco as Diego Hidalgo / Oliver Dunn
 Camila Sodi as Isabel Fernández / Lisa Dunn
 Dulce María as Victoria Lamas 
 Samadhi Zendejas as Circe Gaona
 Eduardo Yáñez as Mateo Corona
 Sonya Smith as Fernanda Orozco
 Azela Robinson as Ramona
 Marco de la O as El Buitre
 Gabriela Roel as Felipa
 Álvaro Guerrero as Ignacio Salas
 Pepe Gámez as Deivid
 Uriel del Toro as Joselito
 Vanessa Acosta as Juliana Hernández
 Rubén Sanz as Father Rafael
 Gimena Gómez as Nuria
 David Palacio as El Man
 Claudia Zepeda as Diana Gutiérrez
 Abril Schreiber as Gabriela
 Toño Valdes as Chucho
 Rebeca Manríquez as Zoraida
 Pascacio López
 Ana Jimena Villanueva as Rosa
 Victor Olveira as Darwin Herfer
 Arnoldo Picazzo as Mauricio
 Latin Lover as El Mister
 Vicky Araico as Guadalupe Girón
 Sebastián Dante as El Cachorro
 Miguel Jiménez as Alberto
 Jean Paul Leroux as Alex
 Otto Sirgo as El Apá
 Barbie Casillas as Amanda / Mary Dunn
 Checo Perezcuadra as Ricardo / Jason Dunn
 Alexa Martín as Victoria Lamas

Episodes

Notes

References 

2020 American television seasons
2020 Mexican television seasons
2021 American television seasons
2021 Mexican television seasons